George William Lucas, 1st Baron Lucas of Chilworth (29 March 1896 – 11 October 1967), was a British businessman and Labour politician.

Lucas was the son of Percy William Lucas and Annette Lucy Lucas of Oxford. He was involved in the motor trade industry and served during the Second World War as Chair of the National Joint Industrial Council of the Motor Vehicle Retail and Repairing Trade. On 27 June 1946 he was given a peerage by the Labour government of Clement Attlee as Baron Lucas of Chilworth, of Chilworth in the County of Southampton. He then served under Attlee as a Lord-in-waiting (government whip in the House of Lords) from 1948 to 1949, as Captain of the Yeomen of the Guard (Deputy Chief Whip in the House of Lords) from 1949 to 1950 and as Parliamentary Secretary to the Ministry of Transport from 1950 to 1951. However, he later fell out with the Labour Party over nationalisation and moved to the cross-benches.

The future Lord Lucas married Sonia Finkelstein (died 1979), the daughter of Marcus Finkelstein, a Latvian fishing-industry tycoon, in 1917. He died in October 1967, aged 71, and was succeeded in the barony by his eldest son Michael, who became a Conservative government minister. His second son, Ivor Lucas, became a diplomat and served as British Ambassador to Syria and Oman.

Notes

References
Kidd, Charles, Williamson, David (editors). Debrett's Peerage and Baronetage (1990 edition). New York: St Martin's Press, 1990, 

Daily Telegraph obituary of 2nd Baron Lucas of Chilworth

1896 births
1967 deaths
Labour Party (UK) Baronesses- and Lords-in-Waiting
Labour Party (UK) hereditary peers
Ministers in the Attlee governments, 1945–1951
Barons created by George VI